Mount Dungarvan is a  mountain summit located in Waterton Lakes National Park, in the Canadian Rockies of Alberta, Canada. Its nearest higher peak is Cloudy Peak,  to the west.

History

The mountain was named in 1943 after the town of Dungarvan in Ireland. Dungarvan is also the Irish term for a rough and broken mountain.

The mountain's name became official in 1943 by the Geographical Names Board of Canada.

Geology

Like other mountains in Waterton Lakes National Park, Mount Dungarvan is composed of sedimentary rock laid down during the Precambrian to Jurassic periods. Formed in shallow seas, this sedimentary rock was pushed east and over the top of younger Cretaceous period rock during the Laramide orogeny. The summit is a series of basalt pinnacles from the Purcell Sill.

Climate

Based on the Köppen climate classification, Mount Dungarvan is located in a subarctic climate with cold, snowy winters, and mild summers. Temperatures can drop below −20 °C with wind chill factors below −30 °C. Precipitation runoff from the mountain drains into tributaries of Waterton River.

See also
Geography of Alberta
List of mountains in the Canadian Rockies

References

External links
 National Park Service web site: Waterton Lakes National Park

Two-thousanders of Alberta
Canadian Rockies
Waterton Lakes National Park